The term Alpine states or Alpine countries refers to the territory of eight countries associated with the Alpine region, as defined by the Alpine Convention of 1991: Austria, France, Germany, Italy, Liechtenstein, Monaco, Slovenia, and Switzerland.

Territory
The territory includes 83 NUTS 3-level local administrative divisions and about 6,200 municipalities.

In a narrow sense, the term "Alpine states" could be applied to Austria (28.7% of the total area), Italy (27.2%), and France (21.4%), which represent more than 77% of the Alpine territory and more than three quarters of the Alpine population. However, for larger countries like Italy and France, the share of their territory within the Alpine region only amounts to 17% and 7% respectively. From a strictly national point of view, and with the exception of microstates Liechtenstein and Monaco, the Alps are dominant in only two countries: Austria (65.5% of its territory) and Switzerland (65%).

See also
 Andean states
 Association of the Alpine States (on state level)
 Baltic states
 Himalayan states

References

States
Regions of Europe
Regions of Eurasia